Mykyta Leonidovych Makhynya (born 16 January 2003) is a Ukrainian professional footballer who plays as a centre-forward for Ukrainian club Mariupol.

References

External links
 Profile on Mariupol official website
 
 

2003 births
Living people
People from Melitopol
Ukrainian footballers
Association football forwards
FC Shakhtar Donetsk players
FC Mariupol players
FC Yarud Mariupol players
Ukrainian Premier League players
Ukrainian First League players
Sportspeople from Zaporizhzhia Oblast